Ross Creek Bridge is a former railway bridge, now used as a pedestrian walkway in Ross Bridge Park, Hoover, Alabama, United States. The text of the sign posted nearby by the Hoover Historical Society reads as follows:
In 1858 James Taylor Ross, a Scotchman migrated to the South, acquired land and homesteaded in what is now Shades Valley. He provided land for the construction of a Confederate railway, including a bridge spanning Ross Creek. After the Ross family moved westward, his property was purchased in 1907 by TCI, a predecessor of U.S. Steel. In 2002, U.S. Steel, Daniel Corp. and the Retirement Systems of Alabama combined to develop the community of Ross Bridge.

References 

https://www.rossbridge.com/history-ross-bridge/

External links 
 Hoover Historical Society
 Marker Points Out History of Ross Bridge and Creek
 Bridge Hunter Article with additional photographs

Hoover, Alabama
Transportation buildings and structures in Jefferson County, Alabama
Railroad bridges in Alabama
Pedestrian bridges in Alabama
Former railway bridges in the United States
Stone arch bridges in the United States